Nomula Narsimhaiah (9 January 1956 – 1 December 2020) was an Indian politician and Member of Telangana Legislative Assembly belonging to Telangana Rashtra Samithi. He was elected as a legislator from Nagarjunasagar constituency in 2018 Telangana general elections by defeating Congress leader Kunduru Jana Reddy by 7771 votes. He was a legislator and a senior leader with CPI-M. He was elected twice as a MLA from Nakrekal assembly constituency and leader of CPI-M in the Legislative Assembly.

He was married and has three children. His son, Nomula Bagath Kumar, is an advocate at the high court of Telangana and also very active in politics and public service. He was helping his father in development of Nagrajuna sagar Constitution.

Early life
He was born in Palem Village Nakrekal Mandal Nalgonda district, Telangana State in Yadav community. In his childhood he was attracted towards communist literature like Telangana Armed Struggle and inspired by legendary personalities. He also loved and was involved in agriculture since his childhood. He has done Master of Arts (MA) and Bachelor of Laws (LLB) at Osmania University.

Political career
In his student life at Osmania University, he has actively led the Students Federation of India. Later, he has joined the Communist Party of India (Marxist). He has been a leading advocate at Nalgonda and Nakrekal judicial courts. He was elected twice as Mandal Parishath President of Nakrekal and elected twice as MLA from Nakrekal constituency in Andhra Pradesh. From 1999 to 2004, he has worked as Floor Leader of CPI(M) in the AP legislative assembly.

TRS Party
Later, he differed with the CPI(M) party's stand on Telangana and joined the Telangana Rashtra Samithi on 8 April 2014 and contested as TRS party candidate from Nagarjuna Sagar (Assembly constituency) in General Elections 2014 and lost the election.

As MLA
From Nagarjunasagar constituency In 2018 Assembly elections, he defeated senior leader and sitting MLA of Indian National Congress Party K. Jana Reddy by 7771 votes.

Death
On 1 December 2020, he died of cardiac arrest due to complications from COVID-19 during the COVID-19 pandemic in India.

References

Telangana Rashtra Samithi politicians
People from Nalgonda
1956 births
2020 deaths
Deaths from the COVID-19 pandemic in India